Oktyabrsky is a rural locality (a village) in Nadezhdinsky Selsoviet, Iglinsky District, Bashkortostan, Russia. The population was 100 as of 2010. There are 4 streets.

Geography 
Oktyabrsky is located 42 km east of Iglino (the district's administrative centre) by road. Kudeyevka is the nearest rural locality.

References 

Rural localities in Iglinsky District